Jerry Lamon Falwell Jr. (born June 17, 1962) is an American attorney, former academic administrator, and former prominent evangelical. Starting with his 2007 appointment upon the death of his father, televangelist and conservative activist Jerry Falwell Sr., Falwell served as the president of Liberty University in Lynchburg, Virginia, until resigning amidst controversy in August 2020.

Early life and education
Jerry Falwell Jr. was born on June 17, 1962, the eldest son of Jerry Sr. and Macel Falwell (née Pate). He attended private schools in the Lynchburg area, including Lynchburg Christian Academy (later renamed as Liberty Christian Academy), from where he graduated in 1980. He then attended Liberty University, where he obtained a Bachelor of Arts in history and religious studies in 1984, and the University of Virginia School of Law, where he obtained a Juris Doctor in 1987.

Career
From 1987 until 2007, Falwell served in private practice in Virginia and as the lawyer for Liberty University and its related organizations. He joined the Board of Trustees of the university in 2000.

2007–2020: Liberty University
As part of a succession plan the elder Falwell laid out before his death, Jerry Jr. was to be entrusted with Liberty University while Jerry Sr.'s other son, Jonathan Falwell, inherited the ministry at Thomas Road Baptist Church. The decisions were rooted in each's personality: Jerry Jr. had aggressive business instincts, and Jonathan was more charismatic and interested in ministry. This succession plan took effect when Jerry Sr. died in 2007.

Under Falwell Jr., Liberty University came under scrutiny for its alleged authoritarian control over employees and students, nepotism toward Falwell family-owned businesses in the school's investments, and increasing influence of Falwell's wife Becki in school affairs. Beginning in 2001, Falwell had established two companies for the purpose of making property deals with Liberty-affiliated nonprofits, and his two sons and their wives were on Liberty's payroll. A 2019 Politico article described the university as a "dictatorship" in which Falwell ruled through fear; it also reported that the university had sold merchandise promoting Donald Trump's presidential campaign, and that Falwell Jr. had crude discussions about his sex life at work and had shown other Liberty employees provocative photos of his wife. Falwell's leadership also came under fire in a letter signed by members of Congress, Andy Levin and Jamie Raskin, to Betsy DeVos, which claimed that Falwell personally blocked students from writing student columns critical of Trump. A Reuters investigation, published in August 2019, alleged that Falwell signed a real estate deal in 2016 that transferred the university's sports facilities to his personal trainer, who did not put down any money for the deal. The publication reported that instead, Liberty immediately paid almost $650,000 to the trainer, who now owned the property, to lease the property for nine years.

On August 7, 2020, Liberty University announced that Falwell would be taking an indefinite leave of absence from his positions following controversy around a photo he had posted on social media, which showed him with his pants unzipped and his arm around the waist of a woman whose shorts were similarly unzipped. On August 23, Falwell made a public statement that his wife had had an affair and that they had been targets of blackmail. The next day Reuters published a story in which the man with whom Falwell's wife had an affair claimed that Falwell regularly watched him engaging in sexual activities with Falwell's wife. Later in the day, on August 24, it was reported that Falwell had agreed to resign from Liberty University. Falwell immediately denied this, while the university claimed that negotiations were ongoing. On August 25, both Falwell and Liberty University confirmed that he had resigned. Because he is leaving his position without a formal accusation or admission of wrongdoing, Falwell will receive a $10.5million severance package.

After his departure, Liberty opened an investigation into his past personal entanglement in the school's finances and real estate. Transactions that personally benefit an individual could jeopardize Liberty's tax-exempt status. In October 2020, Falwell sued Liberty University for damaging his reputation, but in December 2020 dropped the lawsuit.

On April 15, 2021, Liberty University sued Falwell for $40 million in damages for breach of contract and violation of fiduciary duty. In November 2021, Falwell revived his defamation lawsuit against Liberty University.

Possible governmental positions 
In November 2016, Falwell said that President-elect Donald Trump had offered him the position of United States secretary of education, but that he had turned down the offer citing personal reasons and because he did not want to leave Liberty University for more than two years. In January 2017, Falwell said that he had been asked by President Trump to head a task force on reforms for the United States Department of Education. In June 2017, Falwell confirmed to the Chronicle of Higher Education that he would be one of 15 college presidents participating in the task force. The task force was never formed.

Political views

Homosexuality and LGBT rights 

In 1981, in a letter asking for support in keeping his "Old-Time Gospel Hour" television program on the air, Falwell spoke out against the "Homosexual Revolution", saying "With God as my witness, I pledge that I’ll continue to expose the sin of homosexuality to the people of this nation. I believe that the massive homosexual revolution is always a symptom of a nation coming under the judgement of God."
	
In October 1999, at the invitation of his longstanding friend, Soulforce founder Mel White, Falwell hosted a meeting of 200 gays and lesbians and 200 members of his own congregation in Lynchburg, in a debate over gay rights. Falwell said during the meeting that his views about homosexuality were unchanged, but that he would moderate his rhetoric. In the follow-up Frontline interview, Falwell echoed views declared by his father that homosexuality was a sin "forbidden by the Bible", and said that "ex-gays" had said, "They believe that they chose in and they chose out."

In April 2009, following the Miss USA same-sex marriage controversy, Falwell offered a full scholarship to Carrie Prejean, a beauty pageant contestant who stated during the Miss USA pageant: Well I think it's great that Americans are able to choose one way or the other.  We live in a land where you can choose same-sex marriage or opposite marriage.  You know what, in my country, in my family, I think I believe that marriage should be between a man and a woman, no offense to anybody out there.  But that's how I was raised and I believe that it should be between a man and a woman.In August 2013, Falwell announced that if the federal government forced recipients of its aid to comply with LGBTQ discrimination protections, he would forgo the money. In March 2019, Falwell again caused controversy among LGBT advocates at Liberty University when he said his granddaughter would be "raised according to her God-given gender".

Muslims 
Speaking of the 2015 San Bernardino attack, Falwell stated during the university's 2015 convocation that if "some of those people had got what I have in my back pocket right now," the attack would not have happened. He said that he was astounded that Barack Obama believed more gun control was the best response to the attack. Falwell said that he'd "always thought that, if more good people had concealed-carry permits, then we could end those Muslims before they walked in and killed them."

His comments were criticized by both Christians and Muslims. According to one report, Falwell was only heard saying, "then we could end those Muslims before they walked in", with the "and killed them" part drowned out by applause. Falwell later said he was referring to Muslims committing terrorist attacks and not Muslims in general.

Donald Trump 
On January 26, 2016, Falwell announced his endorsement of Donald Trump for the Republican nomination in the 2016 presidential election, causing some Liberty University alumni and other evangelicals to express concern that Falwell had "sold his soul." It was later revealed, in a secretly recorded conversation with comedian Tom Arnold that Trump's personal lawyer and "fixer" Michael Cohen, had helped Falwell recover compromising photos prior to securing his endorsement. On July 21, 2016, at the RNC convention in Cleveland, Ohio, Falwell Jr. called Trump "America's blue collar billionaire" and "one of the greatest visionaries of our time" in his endorsement of the candidate he felt most likely to defend the "right to bear arms," "stop Iran...from becoming a nuclear power," and "appoint conservative pro-life justices to the Supreme Court". 
In an August 19, 2016 editorial in The Washington Post, Falwell compared Trump to Winston Churchill. A group called the Red Letter Christians criticized Falwell for the pivotal role he played in "forging the alliance between white evangelicals and Donald J. Trump, who won 81 percent of their vote." Trump, who is a personal friend of Falwell's, gave the commencement address in 2017 at Liberty University in Lynchburg, a city which has been described by The New York Times as "the heart of pro-Trump evangelical Christianity".

In August 2017, following a white supremacist terror attack in Charlottesville, Falwell defended President Trump, saying that he didn't have "a racist bone in his body," adding that the president was being attacked by "thin-skinned Americans": "You know, he's a little abrasive sometimes in the way he says things, and we have some thin-skinned Americans sometimes who ignore the substance of what he's saying because they're put off by his demeanor," Falwell said. "And I think we need to grow up as a people and stop being so easily offended."

Asked in a January 2019 interview, "Is there anything President Trump could do that would endanger that support from you or other evangelical leaders?", Falwell answered, "No."

Israel 
In June 2016, Falwell expressed support for Israel when Liberty University moved to invest $5million of its endowment in Israel. Falwell stated, "Liberty is glad to be part of supporting the only democracy that's a close ally of the United States [in an area] that is in such turmoil right now."

In April 2017, Falwell referred to Trump as the "dream president" for evangelicals and cited "reuniting Israel with America" and Trump's appointment of "people of faith" in his administration as the reasons why evangelicals support Trump.

Coronavirus response and conspiracy theories 

In March 2020, the coronavirus disease 2019 (COVID-19) began to spread quickly in the United States, leading to the widespread closures of schools and universities. By March 13, most universities in Virginia announced that they were moving their classes to online-only, discontinuing in-person instruction. Falwell announced on March 13 that in-person classes at Liberty University would resume following spring break (March 14–22, 2020) in defiance of those throughout the country who called for schools to be required to close. Also on March 13, Falwell promoted a conspiracy theory that North Korea and China had collaborated to create the coronavirus. He also said that people were overreacting to the coronavirus outbreak and that Democrats were trying to use the situation to harm President Trump.

After Liberty University's spring break, without the knowledge of city officials, Falwell reopened Liberty University on March 23 to students to physically return to the campus despite calls for the campus to stay closed to limit the spread of COVID-19. Falwell then claimed that the mortality rate among young people was low. He also blamed the media for exaggerating the threat of COVID-19, saying, "They are willing to destroy the economy just to hurt Trump."

In response to Falwell's decision to reopen Liberty University, Lynchburg mayor Treney Tweedy said in a statement:
I want the residents in this community to know that at no time did I or the City Manager endorse having the students return to Liberty University's campus or any of the other college or university campuses in our community. In fact, it is quite the opposite. When we asked President Falwell to close his campus, he explained that he had to remain open for on-campus international students who had not gone home, some lab classes and the School of Aviation. President Falwell also noted that the University would be moving to an on-line platform for instruction....

I was very surprised and disappointed to later learn of President Falwell's most recent decision to allow students back on campus. We are in the midst of a public health crisis. I am concerned for the students, faculty and employees at Liberty University, and I am also very concerned for the residents of the Lynchburg community. Liberty University is an important part of this community; however, I believe it was a reckless decision to bring students back on campus at this time. It is unfortunate that President Falwell chose to not keep his word to us and to this community.

Virginia's governor, Ralph Northam, criticized Falwell's decision to reopen Liberty University, citing scripture (1 Corinthians 4:2) to support his statement.

Marybeth Davis Baggett, a professor at Liberty University, protested against Falwell's reopening of the university. In an op-ed published by The Washington Post and Religion News Service, Baggett called Falwell's decision a "foolhardy decision [that] tracks Falwell's conspiratorial thinking about COVID-19 and smacks of defiance." She continued, "[Falwell's] public comments on the pandemic have manifested bravado, self-congratulation and callousness in the extreme, as ... he spewed far-fetched, unsubstantiated and misleading information about the coronavirus outbreak.... By continuing to flout the danger of this novel coronavirus, Falwell also encourages reckless behavior in the university's students."

Prior to the school's reopening on March 23, Liberty University's lead physician Thomas W. Eppes Jr. informed Falwell that, "We've lost the ability to corral this thing." Of Liberty University's 15,000 on-campus students, 1,900 students initially returned, with 800 of those subsequently leaving again. Falwell said that the university administration had "no idea" how many other students had returned to off-campus housing. By March 30, according to a report by Eppes, almost a dozen returning students had symptoms of COVID-19, eight students had been told to self-isolate, three had been tested, and one student (who lived off campus) had tested positive for the virus that causes COVID-19. By March 30, the school implemented a policy requiring any student who returned to school to self-quarantine for 14 days.

An anonymous student filed suit against Liberty University in April, stating in the lawsuit, "Liberty's decision to tell its students that they could remain on campus to continue to use their housing, meal plans, parking, and the benefits of the services and activities for which their fees paid, was not only illusory and emptybecause there were no more on-campus classes -- but it was also extremely dangerous and irresponsible."

Personal life
Jerry Falwell Jr. is married to Becki Tilley and lives on a farm in Bedford County, Virginia. The couple have three children, including businessman Jerry "Trey" Falwell III. Before being let go by the university in 2021, Jerry Falwell Jr. was the  president of university operations at Liberty University. Falwell Jr. also owns the Alton Hostel (also called the Miami Hostel) in Miami's South Beach.

2019 photographs
In 2019, Reuters reported that Falwell asked Trump fixer Michael Cohen for a personal favor: to help get rid of photos described by Cohen as being the kind that would typically be kept "between husband and wife." At least three of the photos were later discovered to be of Falwell's wife.

According to Brandon Ambrosino, writing in Politico in 2019:
Longtime Liberty officials close to Falwell told me the university president has shown or texted his male confidants – including at least one employee who worked for him at Liberty – photos of his wife in provocative and sexual poses.

At Liberty, Falwell is "very, very vocal" about his "sex life," in the words of one Liberty official – a characterization multiple current and former university officials and employees interviewed for this story support. In a car ride about a decade ago with a senior university official who has since left Liberty, "all he wanted to talk about was how he would nail his wife, how she couldn't handle [his penis size], and stuff of that sort," this former official recalled. Falwell did not respond to questions about this incident.

2020–2021 controversies 
In March 2012, Falwell, his wife, and children stayed at the Fontainebleau Miami Beach luxury hotel, where Falwell's wife met and became friends with Giancarlo Granda, a man,  twenty years old who worked there as a pool attendant. The Falwells financially backed their son, Jerry "Trey" Falwell III, and Granda in a 2013 purchase of a South Beach hostel called the Alton Hostel, which operates under the name the Miami Hostel. A lawsuit was filed against the Falwells and the man in 2015, dismissed, and then refiled in August 2017. The plaintiffs, a man and his son, claimed they had helped to think of the hostel business idea but had then been wrongfully left out of the venture.

In May 2020, after Virginia Governor Ralph Northam implemented a mask mandate amid the COVID-19 pandemic, Falwell criticized the mandate and tweeted a picture of a custom mask with Northam wearing blackface. Falwell apologized for the tweet in early June after being widely criticized by African-American alumni for being insensitive to the black community.

In August 2020, Falwell published a photograph on Instagram (since deleted) of himself with his jeans unzipped and his hand around the waist of a young woman whose shorts are similarly unzipped; the image was taken at a party on a private yacht, which Falwell later explained was a costume party themed after the Trailer Park Boys television series. In the photo Falwell was holding a glass of dark liquid, and in the caption he wrote: "I promise that's just black water in my glass. It was a prop only." Journalists observed the partial undress and consumption of alcohol were among actions that violate the Liberty University code of conduct. A former instructor at the university, Congressman Mark Walker (R–NC), called for Falwell's resignation. On August 7, Liberty University announced that Falwell would be taking an indefinite leave of absence from his positions.

In late August, Reuters contacted Falwell and his wife with their initial reporting on his wife's alleged affair with the pool attendant they had met in 2012. Shortly after, on August 23, 2020, Falwell announced in a public statement that his wife had an "improper relationship" several years earlier with a man who later threatened to reveal the affair "unless we agreed to pay him substantial monies". On August 24, Reuters published their report that the man was the pool attendant with whom Falwell had invested in the hostel. The man, now 29 years old, said he began a sexual relationship with the Falwells when he was 20. He claimed that the affair started the same month he met the couple, in March 2012, and continued into 2018. He claimed to have had "frequent" sexual encounters with Becki Falwell while Jerry Falwell Jr. looked on, sometimes in the same room and sometimes remotely via camera. The man shared audiotape, emails, and texts with Reuters as evidence for the veracity of his assertions about the relationship.

Later in the day on August 24, it was reported that Falwell had agreed to resign from Liberty University, though Falwell denied the report. An anonymous university official told The Washington Post that there had been a delay in negotiations. On August 25, Falwell confirmed that he had resigned.

In October 2020, Falwell sued Liberty University for damaging his reputation, but in December 2020 dropped the lawsuit. On April 15, 2021, Liberty University sued him for $40 million for breach of contract and fiduciary duty. The suit also alleged that Falwell failed to disclose to the university's board of trustees his scandalous affair and "personal impairment by alcohol".

2022 Vanity Fair interview 
In January 2022, Falwell Jr. and his wife, Becki Tilley, spoke about their scandal in an interview with Vanity Fair. Tilley admitted to a years-long affair with the pool attendant, Giancarlo Granda, starting in March 2012 and continuing through 2014. She said they met when Granda was working at the Fontainebleau hotel in Miami Beach, and that they had made sex tapes with each other. Falwell said that he once walked in on his wife and the pool attendant having sex; he called it "traumatizing." Tilley said that Granda pressured her into sex on one occasion in 2018 although she "kept saying no", and she realized later it could be considered assault. Granda denied the accusation but did not comment on the rest of the interview, promising answers in a forthcoming book and Hulu documentary, God Forbid: The Sex Scandal That Brought Down a Dynasty.

References

Further reading

Jerry Falwell Jr. Wonkette
Jerry Falwell Jr. Virginia Business

External links
 Official bio from Liberty University 
 

1962 births
Living people
20th-century American lawyers
20th-century Baptists
21st-century American lawyers
21st-century Baptists
American conspiracy theorists
American Christian Zionists
American evangelicals
Baptists from Virginia
Christian fundamentalists
Jerry Falwell
Liberty University alumni
People from Bedford County, Virginia
People from Lynchburg, Virginia
Southern Baptists
University of Virginia School of Law alumni
Virginia Republicans
Virginia lawyers